Speedway is a popular type of motorsport that takes place on oval tracks in New Zealand. A number of tracks throughout the country provide regular racing programs and sanctioned racing series. The seasons tend to be from November to April.

Types of event
There are several types of event in New Zealand speedway including
 championship meetings
 Superstock and Stockcar teams racing
 demolition derbys
 regular club and local points meetings.

Some types of racing (such as figure 8 racing) are banned by Speedway New Zealand, but are run from time to time by independent promoters.

Travelling Series 
There are several types of travelling series in New Zealand speedway including
 Oval Superstars Tour
 Saloon Speedweek
 War of the Wings Sprintcars
 Pro Dirt Super Saloons
 Super Saloon Supercup

Classes
The classes that race at New Zealand tracks include

Venues

North Island

South Island

References

External links
 Speedway The Inside Dirt - Info, News and Media Show
SNZ Speedway New Zealand
 SPEEDWAYLIVE - Live Results and Commentary

New Zealand
Motorsport in New Zealand